Arnold (III) from the kindred Hahót (died 1292) was a Hungarian noble.

He was born into the gens Hahót as one of the two sons of Arnold II, who served as Palatine of Hungary for a short time in 1242. His elder brother was Nicholas III, who rebelled against the rule of King Stephen V in 1270.

Arnold III was first mentioned by contemporary sources in 1266. During his brother's revolt in 1270, Arnold was still minor, as a result he avoided the impeachment, when the rebellion was crushed by Stephen in the same year. Arnold inherited the castle of Sztrigó (or Stridó; today Štrigova, Croatia) in Zala County from his father, thus later charters also referred to him as Arnold of Stridó.

Lodomer, Archbishop of Esztergom and the Kőszegis offered the crown to Andrew the Venetian against Ladislaus IV of Hungary. Andrew arrived to Hungary in early 1290. When he crossed the brother, Arnold, an enemy of the Kőszegis, invited him to his fort of Sztrigó and captured him. Arnold sent Andrew to Vienna, where Albert I, Duke of Austria, held him in captivity for the upcoming months. Ladislaus IV was assassinated on 10 July 1290. With Archbishop Lodomer's assistance, Andrew left his prison in disguise and hastened to Hungary, where he was crowned as Andrew III on 23 July. Despite his former act, Arnold was able to preserve his power and possessions in the western border region. Furthermore, Arnold intended to marry a daughter of Ladislaus Tengerdi, one of the most loyal supporters of Andrew III.

After his brother, Nicholas died childless in 1291, Arnold inherited his estates. However, by then, Nicholas lost the ownership of Pölöske to Nicholas Kőszegi under unknown circumstances. Arnold tried unsuccessfully to regain the castle in the following year, but was killed in the skirmish.

References

Sources

 
 

1292 deaths
13th-century Hungarian people
Arnold 03

Year of birth unknown